This is the discography for American recording artist Kokane.

Albums

Studio albums
Addictive Hip Hop Muzick (1991)
Funk Upon a Rhyme (1994)
They Call Me Mr. Kane (1999)
Mr. Kane, Pt. 2 (2005)
Pain Killer'z (2005)
Back 2 tha Clap (2006)
Gimme All Mine (2010)
The Legend Continues (2011)
Shut da F Up & Cut da Checc (2014)
Lady Kokane Presents: Kokane Love Songs (2015)
King of GFunk (2016)
Lady Kokane Presents: Kokane Love Songs Vol 2 (2017)
It's Kokane Not Lemonhead (2017)
Finger Roll (2019)

Collaboration albums
Gangstarock with Chris Gentry (2002)
The Hood Mob with Contraband & Cricet (2006)
Raine n Lane n Kokane with Raine n Lane (2008)
The New Frontier with Traffik (2012)
Tha Kemistry!! (Joint Album) with Tonik Slam (2018)

Compilation albums

 Don't Bite the Funk Vol. 1 (2003)
 Kokane's 24th Anniversary Album (2015)

Mixtapes
On the Back Streets hosted by DJ Crazy Toones (2010)
Dr. Kokastien hosted by DJ King Assassin (2012)

Guest appearances

References 

Discographies of American artists
Hip hop discographies